The Ship from Shanghai is a 1930 Pre-Code American action film directed by Charles Brabin and written by John Howard Lawson. The film stars Conrad Nagel, Kay Johnson, Carmel Myers, Holmes Herbert and Zeffie Tilbury. The film was released on January 31, 1930, by Metro-Goldwyn-Mayer.  The September 14, 1929 issue of "Loew's Weekly" claimed that it was the first all-talking picture to be made entirely at sea, "a special yacht having been outfitted with sound-absorbent material, from the captain's cabin to the keel, for this purpose.  This yacht will be demolished in the climactic episode of the film."

Premise
On a yacht sailing from Shanghai to the United States carrying wealthy socialites, the sailors, led by a megalomaniac steward (played by Louis Wolheim), revolt and take control of the ship.

Cast
Conrad Nagel as Howard Vazey
Kay Johnson as Dorothy Daley
Carmel Myers as Viola Thorpe
Holmes Herbert as Paul Thorpe
Zeffie Tilbury as Lady Daley
Louis Wolheim as Ted
Ivan Linow as Pete
Jack McDonald as Reid

References

External links
 

1930 films
American action films
1930s action films
Metro-Goldwyn-Mayer films
Films directed by Charles Brabin
American black-and-white films
1930s English-language films
1930s American films